The 2016 United States House of Representatives elections in Oregon were held on November 8, 2016, to elect the five U.S. representatives from the State of Oregon, one from each of the state's 5 congressional districts. The elections coincided with the 2016 U.S. presidential election, as well a senatorial election and the special gubernatorial election, and elections to local offices. The primaries were held on May 17.

All five incumbents were re-elected.

Overview

Final results

District 1

Democratic primary

Candidates
 Suzanne Bonamici, incumbent Representative, of Beaverton
 Shabba Woodley, videographer and poet, of Beaverton

Results

Republican primary

Candidates
 Jonathan E. Burgess, of Tigard
 Brian J. Heinrich, sales representative, of Dundee
 Delinda Morgan, businesswoman; nominee in 2012, candidate in the 2012 special election and in 2014; of Gaston

Results

Independent Party primary

Results

General election

Candidates
 Suzanne Bonamici (D)
 Brian J. Heinrich (R)
 Kyle Sheahan (L), of Hillsboro

Results

District 2

Democratic primary

Candidates
 Jim Crary, retired lawyer, of Ashland

Results

Republican primary

Candidates
 Paul J. Romero, refrigeration repair technician and U.S. Navy veteran, of Prineville
 Greg Walden, incumbent Representative, of Hood River

Results

Independent Party primary

Results

General election

Candidates
 Jim Crary (D)
 Greg Walden (R)

Results

District 3

Democratic primary

Candidates
 Earl Blumenauer, incumbent Representative, of Portland

Results

Republican primary

Candidates
 No declared candidates

Results

Independent Party primary

Candidates
 David W. Walker, nurse practitioner, of Scappoose

Results

General election

Candidates
 Earl Blumenauer (D)
 David Delk (P), of Portland
 David W. Walker (I)

Results

District 4

Democratic primary

Candidates
 Peter DeFazio, incumbent Representative, of Springfield
 Joseph McKinney, businessman, of Eugene

Results

Republican primary

Candidates
 Jo Rae Perkins, Chairwoman of the Linn County Republican Party 2009–12, candidate for Mayor of Albany in 2010, candidate for the U.S. Senate in 2014, of Albany
 Arthur B. Robinson, scientist; Chairman of the Oregon Republican Party 2011–13, nominee in 2010, 2012, 2014; of Cave Junction

Results

Independent Party primary

Results

General election

Candidates
 Mike Beilstein (PG), nominee in 2008, 2010, and 2014, of Corvallis
 Peter DeFazio (D)
 Gil Guthrie (L), of Springfield
 Arthur B. Robinson (R)

Results

District 5

Democratic primary

Candidates
 Dave McTeague, State Representative 1985–95, of Milwaukie
 Kurt Schrader, incumbent Representative, of Canby

Results

Republican primary

Candidates
 Seth Allan, mental health associate, of Canby
 Earl D. Rainey, truck driver, of Rickreall
 Ben West, activist, of Portland
 Colm Willis, lawyer and former political director of Oregon Right to Life, of Stayton

Results

Independent Party primary

Results

General election

Candidates
 Marvin Sandnes (PG), Independent Party candidate for the U.S. Senate in 2016, of Salem
 Kurt Schrader (D)
 Colm Willis (R)

Results

References

2016
United States House of Representatives
Oregon